Star XL may refer to one of the following:

XL Airways Germany, sometimes known as Star XL German Airways
The Weather Star XL IRIX computer built for The Weather Channel (United States)